Fighter Squadron 53, or VF-53  Iron Angels was an aviation unit of the United States Navy in service from  20 July 1950 to 29 January 1971. Originally established as reserve squadron VF-721 on 20 July 1950, it was redesignated as VF-141 on 4 February 1953 and then redesignated as VF-53 on 15 October 1963. The squadron was disestablished on 29 January 1971. It was the fourth US Navy squadron to be designated as VF-53.

Operational history

Korean War

VF-721 equipped with the F9F-2 Panther was assigned to Carrier Air Group 101 (CVG-101) aboard  for a deployment to Korea from 2 March to 24 October 1951. During this deployment the squadron lost 2 aircraft.

During this deployment the squadron lost 4 aircraft and two pilots killed.

1950s-60s

VF-141 equipped with the F2H-3 Banshee was assigned to Carrier Air Group 14 (CVG-14) aboard  for a deployment to the Mediterranean from 3 February to 6 August 1954.

VF-141 equipped with the F4D-1 Skyray was assigned to Carrier Air Group 5 (CVG-5) aboard  for a deployment to the Western Pacific from 12 July to 9 December 1957. The squadron was assigned to Carrier Air Group 14 (CVG-14) aboard  for a deployment to the Western Pacific from 3 January to 27 July 1959.

VF-141 equipped with the F3H Demon was assigned to CVG-14 for a deployment to the Western Pacific aboard  from 14 May to 15 December 1960. The squadron deployed aboard  for a deployment to the Western Pacific from 9 November 1961 to 12 May 1962.

Vietnam

VF-53 was assigned to Carrier Air Wing 5 (CVW-5) and was deployed to Vietnamese waters aboard  three times: 3 January to 15 July 1963; 14 April to 15 December 1964 and 28 September 1965 to 13 May 1966.

VF-53 was deployed on the carrier  from 5 January to 22 July 1967. On 25 March 1967, a squadron F-8E crashed at sea on a non-combat mission, the pilot Lieutenant j.g. James Hise was killed in action, body not recovered.

VF-53 was deployed on the carrier USS Bon Homme Richard three times: from 27 January to 10 October 1968; from 18 March to 29 October 1969 and from 2 April to 12 November 1970. On 29 July 1968, LCDR Guy Kane flying an F-8E shot down a Vietnam People's Air Force MiG-17.

Home port assignments
NAS Glenview NAS Miramar

Notable former members
Thomas J. Hudner Jr.

See also
History of the United States Navy
List of inactive United States Navy aircraft squadrons
List of United States Navy aircraft squadrons

References

External links

Strike fighter squadrons of the United States Navy